Biokovo is a mountain range in Croatia.

Biokovo may also refer to:

Biokovo (Foča), village in Bosnia and Herzegovina
Biokovo Nature Park
 MV Biokovo (built 2009), a ferry